James Chao may refer to:

 James S. C. Chao, founder of the Foremost Group
 James Y. Chao, co-founder of Westlake Chemical